Ettupatti Rasa is a 1997 Indian Tamil-language drama film directed by Kasthuri Raja and produced by V. Natarajan. The film stars Napoleon, Khushbu and Urvashi. It was released on 14 February 1997.

Plot 

Singarasu (Napoleon), a brave and influential man, protects the eight villages living next to the canal. Palaniyamma (Urvashi) is crazy about Singarasu, but Singarasu prefers her soft and sensitive sister Pandiyamma (Khushbu). Singarasu finally marries Pandiyamma.

Marimuthu's (Manivannan) brother (Sukanraj) and Ponrasu's (Ponvannan) daughter (Abitha) are in love. Ponrasu, the village chief, refuses for the wedding, so Singarasu decides to accommodate the lovers in his house and promises to unite them, but later the young lovers commit suicide. So Marimuthu and Ponrasu decide to take revenge on Singarasu. Singarasu, busy in his duty, neglects his wife and is unable to understand her feelings. One day, Marimuthu tells lies about Singarasu to Pandiyamma, and she commits suicide. All the villagers think Singarasu is the killer. Palaniyamma decides to live with Singarasu and he develops a soft corner for her. When Singarasu decides to marry Palaniyamma, a woman explains to him what happened before his late wife's suicide. Pandiyamma was in fact killed by Ponrasu and Marimuthu. What transpires next forms the rest of the story.

Cast 

Napoleon as Singarasu
Khushbu as Pandiyamma
Urvashi as Palaniyamma
Ponvannan as Ponrasu
Manivannan as Marimuthu
Vinu Chakravarthy as Pandiyamma and Palaniyamma's father
Charle as Mokkaiyan
Abitha as Ponrasu's daughter
Sukanraj as Marimuthu's brother
Kumarimuthu
Sempuli Jagan
K. Rajeshkumar
Manangatti Subramaniam
Roopa Sree in a guest appearance
Vichithra in a guest appearance
Ram Lakshman (stunt choreographers) in climax scene

Soundtrack 
The music was composed by Deva, with lyrics written by Kasthuri Raja. "Panjumittai" was one of the famous songs from this film.

Accolades 
At the Tamil Nadu State Film Awards, Napoleon won the Special Prize for Best Actor.

References

External links 
 

1990s Tamil-language films
1997 films
Films directed by Kasthuri Raja
Films scored by Deva (composer)